Lake Mayfield is a reservoir located near Mossyrock, Washington, in Lewis County.  It was created by Mayfield Dam on the Cowlitz River, one of the dams in the Columbia River watershed.

The Mayfield Dam was constructed in 1963 as a concrete arch and gravity dam.

The Cowlitz River Arm is significantly colder than the rest of the lake due to its proximity to the Riffe Lake which is created by Mossyrock Dam. The water from Riffe Lake flows through the Mossyrock Powerhouse's two hydroelectric generators. The Tilton River arm is much warmer and shallower due to past landslides.  Ike Kinswa State Park is located on a peninsula bounded by the Cowlitz River and the Tilton River. The lake contains an island with a lighthouse.

Throughout the 1980s and 1990s, there were many water ski and wake board tournaments held on the lake's Winston Creek arm where the Lake Mayfield Resort is located. The Mayfield Lake Youth camp is located up the Winston Creek arm adjacent to the Winston Creek Falls. The lake is also home to tiger muskies. Tiger muskies were introduced in 1993 to help control northern pikeminnow (squawfish) populations.

See also

List of dams in the Columbia River watershed

References 

Mayfield
Mayfield
Protected areas of Lewis County, Washington
Tacoma Public Utilities